This is a chronological list of expeditions to the Salyut space stations. Initially these expeditions were not numbered, however the crews of Salyut 6 and Salyut 7 were numbered , where n is sequentially increased with each expedition to that particular station. Taxi crews are excluded from this list (see List of human spaceflights to Salyut space stations for details). Salyut commanders are listed in italics. "Duration" refers to the crew and does not always correspond to "Flight up" or "Flight down". Missions which failed to reach or dock with the station are highlighted in red.

The Salyut programme was a series of Soviet space stations launched during the 1970s and 1980s. Six Salyut space stations were crewed, whilst a number of other stations were not, either due to failures, or because they were prototypes and not designed to be crewed. Crewed flights as part of the Salyut programme ended in 1986, when Salyut was superseded by the Mir space station.

See also
 Salyut programme
 List of human spaceflights to Salyut space stations
 List of Salyut visitors
 List of Salyut spacewalks
 List of uncrewed spaceflights to Salyut space stations
 List of Mir Expeditions
 List of International Space Station Expeditions

References

Salyut expeditions
Salyut program
Salyut